Patricia "Trish" Tshilanda Kazadi (born 17 March 1988 in Warsaw) is a Polish actress, singer, dancer, and television personality.

Parents 

Kazadi's mother is from Łuków in Lublin Voivodeship, while her father is from the Democratic Republic of the Congo.

Education 

Kazadi was accepted into the Warsaw University of Technology, where she studied Administration full-time. Unable to complete all the required subjects, she opted for part-time studies at the Warsaw School of Economics. She plays the piano and composes music, and trained in modern dance for two years. She was involved in music, theater, and media from a young age. Kazadi was also a student of the Krzysztof Komeda Second Level School of Popular and Jazz Music in Warsaw.

Television 
She was nurse Jagna Nowak on the TV series Ranczo
 She hosted Everyday English on TVN Lingua; the channel became defunct in 2009.
 From 5 September to 14 November 2010, Kazadi was on Season 12 of Taniec z gwiazdami, the Polish version of Dancing with the Stars. She danced with Łukasz Czarnecki and placed fourth.
 In 2007, she placed third in the second edition of Jak oni śpiewają (How They Sing, the Polish version of Soapstar Superstar). She  made guest appearances in later editions, singing with Żora Koroliow (fourth edition) and Maciej Jachowski (fifth edition). On 22 December 2007 Kazadi sang on the holiday edition of the show, titled Jak oni śpiewają? – Jak oni świętują? (singing with Małgorzata Lewińska and Dominika Figurska), and on 30 May 2009 in a special broadcast titled Jak oni śpiewają – Dzień Dziecka (with Karolina Nowakowska, Aleksandra Szwed, and Monika Mrozowska), winning the Polsat Foundation Heart Statuette. In 2009, she participated in the sixth edition and placed fifth among eleven contestants.
 Kazadi took part in the Great Orchestra of Christmas Charity final in 2011, offering dinner with her and the opportunity to learn the behind the scene secrets of working at TVN Warsaw.
 In 2011 Kazadi replaced Kinga Rusin as the host of You Can Dance: Po prostu tańcz! (the Polish version of So You Think Can Dance).
 Since 2013 Kazadi has been the host of the Polish version of X Factor.
 In 2016 Kazadi got the role as Reri in the Polish biographical series Bodo, which tells the story of the actor and singer Eugene Bodo who died in the Russian Gulag in 1943.

Music 

Kazadi has made guest appearances on albums by Ten Typ Mes, Flexxip, Tewu, 2 Cztery 7, Gorzki and O$ka. In July 2010 she recorded and launched two single with DJ Krist Van D – "On Tonite" and “Be Without You".

Commercials 

She has appeared in commercials for mobile phone company Play and Axe Villa.

Filmography

Polish dubbing

Discography

Albums 

Trip (2013)

Singles 
 2008 - "Scream For Love"
 2010 - "On Tonite" (DJ Krist Van D featuring Patricia Kazadi) 
 2010 - "Be Without You" (DJ Krist Van D featuring Patricia Kazadi)
 2011 - "Hałas"
 2011 - "Go Crazy"
 2012 - "Wanna Feel You Now" (with M. Pokora)
 2013 - "Przerywam sen"

Guest appearances

References 

Polish actresses
Polish ballroom dancers
Polish people of Democratic Republic of the Congo descent
Polish television personalities
1988 births
Living people
You Can Dance: Po prostu tańcz!
Polish hip hop singers
Polish pop singers
English-language singers from Poland
Polish female dancers
21st-century Polish singers
21st-century Polish women singers